ToyWatch is a luxury Italian watchmaking company that was founded in Milan in 2006.

History
ToyWatch began developing in 2006 with the launch of the first collection. During the same year, ToyWatch established its American subsidiary, ToyWatch USA. A second subsidiary has later been opened in Hong Kong.

In 2011 ToyWatch opened shareholding to the ILP III private equity fund managed by J. Hirsch & Co. who held a share of 49%. As of March 2013, the ILP III private equity fund  holds the entire share capital of ToyWatch.

In 2015 the company's products are sold in more than 2,000 stores and in 26 boutiques (11 flagship stores and 15 franchise stores) spread all over the world. Flagship stores can be found, in Italy, in Milan, Rome, Florence, Venice, Porto Cervo and Forte dei Marmi. Some other boutiques are located in cities as London, Paris, Lahore Cannes, Puerto Banus and Kuala Lumpur.

Watches
The company was originally known for producing colorful watches made from plastic. The company today produces watches from a variety of materials including plastic, polycarbonate, plasteramic, aluminum, and steel, and incorporates other materials such as Swarovski elements, silicon, ceramic, gold and diamonds.

ToyWatch watches have been featured on Oprah's Favorite Things list for 2007 and on The Ellen DeGeneres Show in 2009.

Collections

Collections chronology:
2006: Total Stones
2007: Skull
2008: Fluo, Ceramica, Kris
2009: Skeleton, Heavy Metal
2010: J-Looped
2011: Velvety
2012: Metallic Aluminum, Maya
2013: ToyMrHyde
2015: Maya Natural Stones

Collections available at the beginning of 2015 (in alphabetical order):
Cruise
Cruise Graffiti
Fluo
Jetlag
Monnalisa
Monochrome
Maya
Maya Chrono
Maya Natural Stones
Metallic Collection
Total Stones
ToyCandy
ToyCruise Metal
ToyFloat
ToyGlass
ToyGlow
ToyMrHyde
ToyRing
ToyStrong
ToySwing
ToyViper
Velvety
Vintage Collection

References

External links
 Official Website

Italian brands
Watch manufacturing companies of Italy
Manufacturing companies based in Milan
Fashion accessory brands